Vinayaditya may refer to any of the following kings who ruled in present-day India:

 Vinayaditya of Vatapi (r. c. 680–696), a ruler of the Chalukya dynasty of Vatapi, titled Yuddhamalla
 Vinayaditya of Podana (r. c. 750-755 CE), a ruler of the Chalukya dynasty of Vemulavada, titled Yuddhamalla
 Vinayaditya (Hoysala dynasty) (r. c. 1047-1098), a ruler of the Hoysala dynasty of Dvarasamudra